Zach Fenoglio (born July 29, 1989) is a former rugby union footballer who played as a hooker for the United States national rugby union team. Fenoglio debuted for the U.S. national team on November 9, 2012, against Russia. Fenoglio was named to the U.S. national team for the 2015 Rugby World Cup.

Fenoglio played his club rugby in Denver, Colorado with the Glendale Raptors in Major League Rugby.

Fenoglio was a four-year letter winner at Regis Jesuit High School on both the football and rugby teams, despite hitting his growth spurt his senior year.

References

1989 births
Living people
United States international rugby union players
American rugby union players
Sportspeople from Denver
Denver Stampede players
American Raptors players
Rugby union hookers